William Erskine Johnston (May 5, 1905 – November 24, 1993) was a Canadian politician, who represented Carleton in the Legislative Assembly of Ontario from 1955 to 1971 as a Progressive Conservative member.

Johnston married Aleta Charlotte Bishop (1913–1994).

Originally elected in the general election in 1955, he was re-elected in the general elections in 1959, 1963 and 1967. Despite his lengthy political service, Johnston never served in Cabinet, nor as a Parliamentary Assistant, but he did serve on over 40 Standing Committees. Johnston retired from politics in 1971. W. Erskine Johnston Public School, which opened in 1969 in the Ottawa suburb of Kanata, was named after Johnston in recognition of his long public service.

He died at an Ottawa hospital in 1993. He is buried at St. James Cemetery, Carp, Ontario.

References

External links 
 

1905 births
1993 deaths
Progressive Conservative Party of Ontario MPPs